The Blue Fox is a 1921 American silent adventure film serial directed by Duke Worne. An incomplete print of the film exists at the UCLA Film and Television Archive.

Cast
 Ann Little as Ann Calvin
 J. Morris Foster as John Densmore
 Joseph W. Girard as Hawk Baxter
 Charles Mason as Robert Winslow
 William LaRock as Tarka
 Lon Seefield
 Fred L. Wilson
 Hope Loring

Chapter titles
 Message of Hate
 Menace from the Sky
 Mysterious Prisoner
 A Perilous Ride
 A Woman's Wit
 A Night of Terror
 Washed Ashore
 A Perilous Leap
 Lost Identity
 In Close Pursuit
 The Wilds of Alaska
 The Camp of the Charkas
 The Secret Skull
 The Desert Island
 Home and Happiness

See also
 List of film serials
 List of film serials by studio

References

See also
List of partially lost films

External links

1921 films
1921 adventure films
American silent serial films
American black-and-white films
Films directed by Duke Worne
1920s rediscovered films
American adventure films
Rediscovered American films
1920s English-language films
Arrow Film Corporation films
Silent adventure films
1920s American films